The Toulnustouc generating station, is a hydroelectric power generating station managed by Hydro-Québec on the Toulnustouc River in the territory of Côte-Nord, Quebec, Canada.
It has an installed capacity of 526 MW.
The power station is fed by water from a dam and dyke that contain the Lake-Sainte-Anne reservoir.

Project

A dam  and  dyke were built to enlarge the existing  Lake-Sainte-Anne reservoir for the use by the Toulnustouc hydroelectric project.
RSW of Montreal was selected as the prime consulting engineers.
VINCI Construction Grands Projets undertook construction.
The development was carried out in partnership with the Pessamit Council and the Manicouagan Regional County Municipality.

Work started in November 2001, and for the next four years the project employed 425 people on average, peaking at 1,200 workers in the summer of 2003.
The average worker was aged over 50.
Total cost was over CDN$800 million.
The reservoir started to fill on 10 February 2005 and reached its maximum operating level on 29 April 2005.
The plant entered service four months ahead of schedule on 1 July 2005.
The Toulnustouc hydroelectric plant was officially inaugurated on 18 August 2005 by Quebec Premier Jean Charest and Thierry Vandal, CEO of Hydro-Québec.

Dam

The dam structure is concrete face rockfill using materials from the spillway excavations, with impermeability provided by the concrete face slab.
This was an innovative choice for the Nordic environment with its large temperature variations and ice loads in winter.
Submersible tiltmeters were installed along two cross-sectional lines on the dam and the south dike to measure slab deflection so that Hydro-Québec could confirm that any structural movement was within the acceptable range.

Dyke and supply tunnel

A tunnel from the end of the south dyke carries water to the hydroelectric plant, which is just below PK55 on the river.

Plant

The Toulnustouc generating station is on the Toulnustouc River in the Manicouagan watershed.
It has an installed capacity of 526 MW from two generating units.
The plant produces 2,660 GW/h annually.

Notes

Sources

 

Hydroelectric power stations in Quebec